Acanthoscelidius guttatus is a species of minute seed weevil in the family of beetles known as Curculionidae. It is found in North America.

References

Further reading

 
 

Curculionidae
Articles created by Qbugbot
Beetles described in 1896